Oncideres pallifasciata is a species of beetle in the family Cerambycidae. It was described by Noguera in 1993. It is known from Mexico.

References

pallifasciata
Beetles described in 1993